Screven County School District is a public school district in Screven County, Georgia, United States, based in Sylvania. It serves the communities of Hiltonia, Newington, Oliver, Rocky Ford, and Sylvania.

Schools
The district has one high school, one middle school, and one elementary school:
Screven County High School
Screven County Middle School
Screven County Elementary School

References

External links

School districts in Georgia (U.S. state)
Education in Screven County, Georgia